Shuberskoye is a rural locality (a settlement) and the administrative center of Shuberskoye Rural Settlement, Novousmansky District, Voronezh Oblast, Russia. The population was 2,150 as of 2010. There are 10 streets.

Geography 
Shuberskoye is located 18 km north of Novaya Usman (the district's administrative centre) by road. Polynovka is the nearest rural locality.

References 

Rural localities in Novousmansky District